HMS Sturdy was a S-class submarine of the third batch built for the Royal Navy during World War II. She survived the war and was scrapped in 1958.

Design and description
The third batch was slightly enlarged and improved over the preceding second batch of the S-class. They displaced  on the surface and  submerged. The S-class submarines had a crew of 48 officers and ratings.

For surface running, the boats were powered by two  diesel engines, each driving one propeller shaft. When submerged each propeller was driven by a  electric motor. They could reach  on the surface and  underwater.

The boats were armed with seven 21 inch (533 mm) torpedo tubes. A half-dozen of these were in the bow and there was one external tube in the stern. They carried six reload torpedoes for the bow tubes for a grand total of thirteen torpedoes. Twelve mines could be carried in lieu of the internally stowed torpedoes. They were also armed with a 3-inch (76 mm) deck gun.

Construction and career
HMS Sturdy was built by Cammell Laird and launched on 30 September 1943. She survived the Second World War, spending most of it in the Pacific Far East, where she sank eleven Japanese sailing vessels, two Japanese tugboats and three barges, three Japanese fishing vessels, five small unidentified Japanese vessels, a coaster, two small Japanese landing craft, the Japanese communication vessels No.142 and No.128 and the Japanese ships Kosei Maru (99 BRT) and Hansei Maru. 
She visited Rønne on the Baltic island of Bornholm, Denmark, on 4 July 1956.
Sturdy was sold in July 1957. She arrived at the yards of Clayton and Davie on 9 May 1958 for breaking up.

Notes

References
 
  
 
 
 

 

British S-class submarines (1931)
1943 ships
Ships built on the River Mersey
World War II submarines of the United Kingdom